John Benedict Romero-Martinez is an American politician who served as a member of the Wyoming House of Representatives for the 44th district. from 2021 to 2023.

Background 
Romero-Martinez was born and raised in Cheyenne, Wyoming. He earned an associate of arts degree in sociology from the University of Wyoming.

References 

Living people
Republican Party members of the Wyoming House of Representatives
Politicians from Cheyenne, Wyoming
University of Wyoming alumni
21st-century American politicians
Year of birth missing (living people)
American politicians of Mexican descent
Latino conservatism in the United States